A highway strip, road runway or road base is a section of a highway, motorway or other form of public road that is specially built to act as a runway for (mostly) military aircraft and to serve as an auxiliary military air base. These runways allow military aircraft to continue operating even if their regular air bases, some of the most vulnerable targets in any war, are degraded or destroyed.

The first highway strips were constructed near the end of World War II in Nazi Germany, where the well developed Reichsautobahn system allowed aircraft to use the motorways. During the Cold War highway strips were systematically built on both sides of the Iron Curtain, in many cases in response to the Six Day War and Operation Focus in 1967, where the Israeli Air Force in a surprise air strike disabled many of their opponents' air bases in just a few hours. Countries that have built highway strips include both West and East Germany, Singapore, North Korea, Taiwan, Sweden, Finland, Bulgaria, Switzerland, Poland, India, Pakistan and Czechoslovakia.

Design
The strips are usually  straight sections of the highway, where any central reservation is made of crash barriers that can be removed quickly (in order to allow airplanes to use the whole width of the road), and other features of an airbase (taxiways, airport ramps) can be built. The road will need a thicker-than-normal surface and a solid concrete base. The specialized equipment of a typical airfield are stored somewhere nearby and only carried there when airfield operations start. The highway strips can be converted from motorways to airbases typically within 24 to 48 hours. The road would need to be swept to remove any debris before use by aircraft. Road runways can however also be quite small—the short runways built in the Swedish Bas 90 system are commonly only  in length. The STOL-capability of the Viggen and Gripen allowed for such short runways. In the case of Finnish road airbases, the space needed for landing aircraft is reduced by means of a wire, similar to the CATOBAR system used on some aircraft carriers.

Around the world
A number of countries around the world utilise the strategy of highways constructed to double as auxiliary airbases in the event of war.

Australia

While not designed for military use, in outback Australia some sections of highway are maintained as emergency runways for use by the Royal Flying Doctor Service.

Bosnia and Herzegovina
In Glamoč, Bosnia and Herzegovina, the M15 road was used as a military airstrip. There is a clear example of how the road was widened for the needs of airplane landing.

China
In 1989 China conducted its first highway strip drills. They have since been conducted at later dates and in different areas of the country. In 2014 Chinese forces landed warplanes on a highway strip in Henan province for the first time.

Cyprus
After the Turkish invasion of Cyprus, three highway strips were built in the Greek part of Cyprus, easily recognisable by a runway centre line and markings for the touchdown zone. They also all have aircraft turning areas at either end. One is located on the A1 Limassol–Nicosia Highway and one near the western end of the A5 Limassol–Larnaca highway. The third is a much smaller strip located on the A6 Limassol-Paphos Highway near to Paphos International Airport.

Estonia
During the Operation Saber Strike exercises in 2016 and 2018, A-10 Thunderbolt II aircraft from the US Air National Guard operated from former Warsaw Pact road runways in Estonia.

Finland

In the Winter War of 1939-1940 the Finnish Air Force re-deployed its aircraft to makeshift airfields including frozen lakes to preserve them against Soviet air attack. The tactic was successful, with Soviet air raids on bases causing little damage and the vastly outnumbered Finnish aircraft scoring a high number of aerial victories.

Throughout the Cold War the Finnish Air Force maintained a network of secondary airfields including civilian airports and road bases to improve survivability and effectiveness in the event of war.

As of 2017, all aircraft in the Finnish Air Force are capable of operating from road bases.

Currently Finland conducts drills on its road bases, around once a year. In the Baana 16 exercise in 2016 the Finnish Air Force flew F/A-18C and BAE Hawk, Pilatus PC-12 and C295M aircraft from a highway in Lusi. The Finnish Air Force uses arresting cables to quickly stop F/A-18s, which were originally designed to operate from aircraft carriers. The Swedish Air Force also took part in the 2015 and 2016 exercises, flying Gripen fighters.

Germany

Germany has a number of highway strips (NLP-Str - , "emergency airfields on roads").

India
India has successfully tested its runway strip on a stretch of the Yamuna Expressway in Uttar Pradesh on 21 May 2015. It was built at a cost of ₹130 billion for its combat jets of the IAF, a first for military aviation in the country. In June 2016, the Minister for Road Transport and Highways, Nitin Gadkari announced that the government was considering developing 'Road Runways' for commercial operations as well.
India successfully tested another runway strip on a stretch of the Agra Lucknow Expressway in Uttar Pradesh on 24 October 2017. On September 9, 2021, the Minister for Road Transport and Highways Nitin Gadkari and the Minister of Defence Rajnath Singh inaugurated India's first runway strip on a National Highway in Barmer, Rajasthan and, a mock emergency landing was conducted with the two ministers and the Air Chief Marshal R. K. S. Bhadauria on-board a military transport aircraft.

Japan
In Hokkaido Prefecture the Japan Self-Defense Forces have Kenebetsu Air Base and Yakumo Sub Base as alternative air bases.

North Korea

North Korea has established a large number of highway strips to use in case of war.

Pakistan

In Pakistan, The M-1 Motorway (Peshawar-Islamabad) and the M-2 Motorway (Islamabad-Lahore) each include two emergency runway sections of  length each. The four emergency runway sections become operational by removing removable concrete medians using forklifts. The Pakistan Air Force (PAF) has used the M2 motorway as a runway on two occasions: for the first time in 2000 when it landed an F-7P fighter, a Super Mushak trainer and a C-130 and, again, in 2010. On the last occasion, the PAF used a runway section on the M2 motorway on 2 April 2010 to land, refuel and take-off two jet fighters, a Mirage III and an F-7P, during its Highmark 2010 exercise. In March 2019, Pakistan also used 
a section of M2 motorway to land its fighter jets to demonstrate its capability.

Poland
A large number of highway strips (DOL - , lit "road airfield section") were built during the Cold War in Poland. As of 2003, only one highway strip is used annually for an exercise.

Singapore
The Republic of Singapore Air Force periodically conducts an "alternate runway exercise". It was first conducted on 17 April 1986 with F-5 and A-4 aircraft. The seventh exercise, "Torrent 2016", was conducted near Tengah Air Base in November 2016. Signs, street lights and other fixtures were removed, and landing equipment installed temporarily, which included mobile arresting gear for the first time. F-15SG and F-16C/D fighters participated in the 2016 exercise.

South Korea

As with North Korea, South Korea has also established a number of highway strips.

Soviet Union
A large number of highway strips were built in the former USSR ("airfield part of road").

Sri Lanka
Tamil separatist group LTTE operated in northern Sri Lanka prior to their elimination in 2009, used highways as landing strips.

Sweden

Sweden started establishing road runways as alternative bases with the introduction of the Bas 60 system in the late 1950s. The Six-Day War in 1967 (where the Egyptian Air Force was grounded by a quick surprise attack on air bases) and the introduction of long range attack aircraft (primarily the Su-24) inspired further development, resulting in the Bas 90 system. Improvements in the Bas 90 system included construction of short backup runways in the direct vicinity of the air bases and further dispersion of ground operations. The Viggen and the Gripen were both designed with STOL capability in order to utilize shorter runways.

The Swedish Air Force did not practice using their road bases for around a decade in the early 21st century, but in 2015 and 2016 its Saab JAS 39 Gripen fighters participated in Finnish Air Force road base drills. In September 2017, the air force conducted exercises on a number of road bases for the first time in over a decade.

Switzerland 

A number of highway strips called NOLA/NOSTA were set up from 1969 to 2004.
 Oensingen A1 (training: 1970 STRADA with Venom),
 Münsingen A6 (training: 1974 STRADA with Venom, Hunter and P-3. 1982 TAUTO with Hunter and Tiger.), 
 Flums A13 (training: 1977 NOLA with Hunter and AA, 1985 TAUTO with Hunter and Tiger),
 Alpnach A8 (NOSTA) connected to Alpnach Air Base (training: 1978 NOSTA with Hunter),
 Lodrino A2 connected to Lodrino Air Base (training: 1991 STRADA with Hunter, Tiger and AA),
 Bex A9 (training: 1980 ABEX with 36 Hunter),
 Sion A9 connected to Sion Air Base (training: 1988 with Tiger
 Payerne A1 connected to Payerne Air Base.

Taiwan
Taiwan built a number of highway strips (lit. "war spare runway").

United States
A persistent myth claims that "one mile in every five must be straight for use as an airstrip in times of war or other emergencies". However, no legislation containing this provision was ever passed. The Defense Highway Act of 1941 provided for the operation of "flight strips" alongside highways, but did not mandate the use of the road itself.

For Exercise Northern Strike 2021,  A-10 Thunderbolt IIs from the 354th Fighter Squadron and the Michigan Air National Guard’s 127th Wing along with two C-146A Wolfhounds from the Air Force Special Operations Command participated in the exercise. The aircraft landed on state highway M-32 as part of Northern Strike 21, a large-scale training exercise, in Alpena, Michigan. This was the first time US military aircraft had used highways as airstrips on US soil. The US Air Force repeated this training with the Rally in Rockies exercise in Sept. 12-17.

Gallery

See also
 Underground hangar

References